The Punisher (Frank Castle) is a Marvel comic book character.

Punisher or the Punisher may also refer to:

Marvel Comics "The Punisher" franchise

Characters
 Lynn Michaels, a character who briefly used the alias, from the Marvel Comics main 616 universe

Comic books

Punisher (comic book), a comic book title mostly starring the Frank Castle character
 Punisher (1995 series), first series of the title
 Punisher (2009 series), second series of the title
The Punisher (comic book), a comic book title mostly starring the Frank Castle character

Video games
The Punisher (1990 NES video game), a 1990 video game based on the Marvel Comics character
The Punisher (1990 computer game), a 1990 computer game based on the Marvel Comics character
The Punisher (1993 video game), a 1993 arcade game based on the Marvel Comics character
The Punisher (2004 video game), a 2005 video game based on the Marvel Comics character

Films

The Punisher (1989 film), a 1989 film based on the Marvel Comics character
The Punisher (2004 film), a 2004 film based on the Marvel Comics character
The Punisher: War Zone, a 2008 film based on the Marvel Comics character

Music
The Punisher (1989 score), the score from the 1989 film
The Punisher (2004 score), the score from the 2004 film
The Punisher: The Album, the album for the 2004 film

Television
The Punisher (TV series), an American web series based on the Marvel Comics character

Other entertainment
Punisher (1968 film), a Soviet drama film
Punisher (album), by Phoebe Bridgers, 2020
"Punisher", a song by Veil of Maya from Eclipse
Punisher (Galactus), a robot in the service of the Marvel comic book character Galactus
The Punisher, a character on the Canadian YTV game show Uh Oh!

Military
Punisher (drone), a small Ukrainian unmanned aircraft used to defend against the 2022 Russian invasion
XM25 CDTE, a grenade launcher, also known as the Punisher

People

Nickname
Andre Agassi (born 1970), American tennis player
Aristides Aquino (born 1994), Dominican outfielder for the Cincinnati Reds
Rodrigo Duterte (born 1945), Filipino politician
Marek Piotrowski (born 1964), Polish mixed martial artist
Ramazan Ramazanov (born 1984), Russian mixed martial artist

Stagename
The Punisher, former ring name of WWE wrestler The Undertaker (born 1965)
The Punisher, alias of TNA wrestler Andrew Martin (1975–2009)